Bay Dreams is an annual music festival held in Tauranga and Nelson, New Zealand. 
The festival began in Tauranga in 2016 and in 2019 expanded to Nelson.

Line-ups

2016
Bay Dreams launched on 2 January 2016. It featured Pendulum, David Dallas, Carmada, P-Money, and The Black Seeds.

2017
Bay Dreams 2017 took place on 2 January 2017, quickly arising to become the largest summer festival that season with over 18,500 attendees. It featured Yelawolf, Shapeshifter, Sticky Fingers, Grandmaster Flash, Peking Duk, Ryan Hemsworth, and Mitch James

2018
Bay Dreams 2018 took place on 2 January 2018. It featured DJ Snake, Foster the People, Machine Gun Kelly, Ocean Alley.

2019

North 
Bay Dreams North 2019 took place on 2 January 2019, with a warm up event on 1 January. It featured Cardi B, Rich The Kid, Tash Sultana, Shapeshifter, Sticky Fingers, Peking Duk, Suicideboys, Macky Gee, Pnau, Sheck Wes, Katchafire.

Migos were scheduled to perform, however pulled out of the festival and were replaced with Sheck Wes and Rich The Kid.

30,000 attended the event making it New Zealand's largest festival.

South 
Bay Dreams South 2019 launched on 4 January 2019. It featured Tash Sultana, Shapeshifter, Sticky Fingers, Peking Duk, Suicideboys, Macky Gee, Pnau, Katchafire.

20,000 attended this first event making it the largest festival in the South Island.

2020
Bay Dreams 2020 took place in Tauranga on January 2 and in Nelson on January 4. Both events featured headlining act Tyler, The Creator, as well as Skepta, Yelawolf, Ocean Alley, Gunna, Cordae, and more.

2021
Bay Dreams 2021 was held in Tauranga on 3 January and in Nelson on 5 January. Both events featured headlining DJ sets from Peking Duk, Sub Focus, and Dimension among others.

They also featured sets from artists and bands such as EarthGang, HP Boyz, Dave Dobbyn, Katchafire, Home Brew, Melodownz, and more. The Nelson event also featured a set from L.A.B.

2022
The 2022 event was eventually cancelled in light of the ongoing COVID-19 Pandemic.

The line-up included: Netsky, Chase & Status, Tash Sultana, Hybrid Minds, Blindspott, and more.

2023
The upcoming 2023 Bay Dreams event is slated to occur, 3 January (Mount Maunganui) and 5 January 2023 (Nelson).

The line-up includes: Diplo, Denzel Curry, Freddie Gibbs, Hybrid Minds Outlines, ONEFOUR, KOVEN, SG Lewis, Sticky Fingers and more.

References

External links
Bay Dreams website

Electronic music festivals in New Zealand
Music festivals established in 2016
Summer events in New Zealand